The Vincent-McCall Company Building, now the VMC Lofts, is located in Kenosha, Wisconsin.

History
The building was opened as the main production plant used by the Windsor Spring Company, later to be known as the Vincent-McCall Company. Products manufactured in the building include metal springs and various types of furniture items. During World War II, the plant produced equipment used in the war effort, including bunks and berths for soldiers. The plant remained in operation until 1963. It has since been converted into an apartment building.

The building was added to the State Register of Historic Places in 2017 and to the National Register of Historic Places in 2018.

References

Industrial buildings and structures on the National Register of Historic Places in Wisconsin
National Register of Historic Places in Kenosha County, Wisconsin
World War II on the National Register of Historic Places
Buildings and structures in Kenosha, Wisconsin
United States home front during World War II
Late 19th and Early 20th Century American Movements architecture
Brick buildings and structures
Industrial buildings completed in 1900
Apartment buildings in Wisconsin
Springs (mechanical)